Gerald Rawlinson (1904–1975) was a British actor.

Selected filmography
The Hellcat (1928)
Life's a Stage (1928)
The Rising Generation (1928)
Young Woodley (1928)
The Silent House (1929)
The Devil's Maze (1929)
Alf's Carpet (1929)
The Night Porter (1930)
Young Woodley (1931)
Creeping Shadows (1931)
Tell England (1931)
Dangerous Seas (1931)
Brown Sugar (1931)
The Man at Six (1931)
The Old Man (1931)
Threads (1932)
The Callbox Mystery (1932)
Collision (1932)
Sleepless Nights (1933)
Excess Baggage (1933)
Daughters of Today (1933)
You Made Me Love You (1933)
Easy Money (1934)
 Say It with Diamonds (1935)
When the Devil Was Well (1937)
His Lordship Regrets (1938)

References

External links

1904 births
1975 deaths
Male actors from Lancashire
English male film actors
20th-century English male actors